Manwan may refer to:

Manwan, Pakistan, settlement in the Khyber-Pakhtunkhwa province of Pakistan.
Manwan Dam, dam in China